The Chinese Ambassador to Myanmar is the official representative of the People's Republic of China to the Republic of the Union of Myanmar.

List of representatives 

China–Myanmar relations

References 

 
Myanmar
China